Come Along And Ride This Train is a Bear Family Records 4-CD box set of Johnny Cash's music. This set brings together all of his uniquely American albums: Ride This Train, Blood, Sweat and Tears, Sings the Ballads of the True West, Bitter Tears: Ballads of the American Indian, America: A 200-Year Salute in Story and Song, From Sea to Shining Sea, and The Rambler.

Track listing

Credits
Mastered By - Duncan Cowell
Producer - Don Law, Frank Jones, Larry Butler, Charlie Bragg, Jack Routh
Reissue Producer - Richard Weize

Fiction about rail transport
1991 compilation albums
Johnny Cash compilation albums
Bear Family Records compilation albums